The 5th Central Committee of the Workers' Party of Korea (WPK) was elected at the 5th Congress on 13 November 1970. and remained in session until the election of the 6th Central Committee on 14 October 1980. In between party congresses and specially convened conferences the Central Committee is the highest decision-making institution in the WPK and North Korea. The Central Committee is not a permanent institution and delegates day-to-day work to elected bodies, such as the Political Committee, the Secretariat and the Inspection Committee in the case of the 5th Central Committee. It convenes meetings, known as "Plenary Session of the [term] Central Committee", to discuss major policies. Only full members have the right to vote, but if a full member cannot attend a plenary session, the person's spot is taken over by an alternate. Plenary session can also be attended by non-members, such meetings are known as "Enlarged Plenary Session", to participate in the committee's discussions.

Plenums

Members

Full

Candidates

References

Citations

Sources
General
References for plenary sessions, apparatus heads, the Central Committee full- and candidate membership, Political Committee membership, Standing Committee membership, secretaries, Organisation Committee members, membership in the Inspection Commission, offices an individual held, retirement, if the individual in question is military personnel, female, has been expelled, is currently under investigation or has retired:
 } Information on the meeting dates of the plenary sessions, their official name, the meeting agenda and meeting decisions.
 } Information on the composition of the Central Committee and the composition of the elected bodies of the Central Committee.
 } Information on the composition of the Supreme People's Assembly and it's Standing Committee.
 } Information on the composition of the 5th Government of the DPRK.
  A list of every minister that served in the DPRK government since its inception until 1980.

Bibliography
 

5th Central Committee of the Workers' Party of Korea
1970 establishments in North Korea
1980 disestablishments in North Korea